William Joseph Humphrey  (born 17 October 1967) is a Unionist politician from Northern Ireland representing the Democratic Unionist Party (DUP). Humphrey was a Member of the Northern Ireland Assembly (MLA) for North Belfast from 2010 to 2022, replacing Nigel Dodds.

Born in the Woodvale area of Belfast, Humphrey studied at the Boys' Model School. A member of the Woodvale Residents' Association, he joined the Democratic Unionist Party, becoming its chairman in North Belfast, and a member of the party's executive.

He was elected to Belfast City Council in the Court district at the 2005 Northern Ireland local elections, then served as High Sheriff of Belfast in 2006.

At the 2007 Northern Ireland Assembly election, Humphrey stood in North Belfast, but was not elected. He moved to contest West Belfast at the UK general election, 2010, but took only 7.6% of the votes cast. In June, he became Deputy Lord Mayor of Belfast,

In September 2010, he was selected to replace Nigel Dodds in the Northern Ireland Assembly, representing North Belfast and was elected at the 2011 Assembly election. Referencing his predecessor, Humphrey said, "Nigel has a proven track record of dedicated hard work on the ground, making a difference in peoples' lives within the Constituency...That will be the record I will strive to emulate."

Humphrey was appointed Member of the Order of the British Empire (MBE) in the 2021 New Year Honours for public service, particularly during the COVID-19 response.

In 2022, Humphrey announced that he would not contest the 2022 Assembly election.

References

1967 births
Living people
Politicians from Belfast
Democratic Unionist Party MLAs
Members of Belfast City Council
Northern Ireland MLAs 2007–2011
Northern Ireland MLAs 2011–2016
Northern Ireland MLAs 2016–2017
Northern Ireland MLAs 2017–2022
High Sheriffs of Belfast
Members of the Order of the British Empire